Committee of Radio and Television "Polish Radio and Television" (also called as a Radiocomittee - Radiokomitet) was an institution, which managed all stations of Polish Television and Polish Radio in People's Republic of Poland (PRL) and in the Republic of Poland. It was replaced by two separate entities in 1993 - Polish Radio and Polish Television.

External links 
Polish Television
Polish Radio

Television in Poland
Polskie Radio